Pilkington is a Japanese-owned glass-manufacturing company which is based in Lathom, Lancashire, United Kingdom. In the UK, it includes several legal entities and is a subsidiary of Japanese company NSG Group.

Prior to its acquisition by NSG in 2006, it was an independent company listed on the London Stock Exchange and for a time was a constituent of the FTSE 100 Index.

History

The company was founded in 1826 as a partnership between members of the Pilkington and Greenall families, based in St Helens, Lancashire (now Merseyside). The venture used the trading name of St Helens Crown Glass Company. On the departure from the partnership of the last Greenall in 1845, the firm became known as Pilkington Brothers. In 1894, the business was incorporated under the Companies Act 1862 as Pilkington Brothers Limited.

Pilkington was floated as a public company on the London Stock Exchange in 1970. It was for many years the biggest employer in the northwest industrial town. The distinctive blue-glass head office tower block on Alexandra Business Park, off Prescot Road, used as the firm's world HQ, and completed in 1964, still dominates the town's skyline.

Between 1953 and 1957, Alastair Pilkington and Kenneth Bickerstaff invented the float glass process, a revolutionary method of high-quality flat glass production by floating molten glass over a bath of molten tin, avoiding the costly need to grind and polish plate glass to make it clear. Pilkington then allowed the Float Process to be used under licence by numerous manufacturers around the world.

Pilkington, with its subsidiary Triplex Safety Glass, in which it gradually acquired a controlling interest, also became a major world supplier of toughened and laminated safety glass to the automotive, aerospace and building industries.

During the 1960s and 1970s, Pilkington used the flow of Float royalties to invest in float glass plants in several countries including Argentina, Australia, Canada and Sweden, and also to acquire major existing flat and safety glass producers and plants in the United States (Libbey Owens Ford), Germany and France.

A Monopolies Commission report in 1967, concluded that Pilkington and Triplex operations were efficient and entrepreneurial and, despite their high share of the UK glass trade, operated in a manner suited to consumers' best interests.

A rank-and-file strike in 1970, sparked off by an error in wage packets, brought 8,000 workers out for nearly two months. The General and Municipal Workers Union and Trades Union Congress leadership failed to provide any support, as they were too closely bound to management and government circles, with the result that strike leaders were blacklisted. Anti-union legislation was introduced by central government. These events were recreated in Ken Loach's film The Rank and File, although the BBC insisted on a change in the name and location of the company, so that the film is set at a Wilkinsons in the West Midlands.

In late 1985, Pilkington was the subject of an unfriendly take-over bid from BTR Industries, a large British-based conglomerate group. Pilkington's efforts to reject the bid were assisted by its employees, the town and some government ministers. Their joint successful work was followed by a withdrawal of BTR's offer in early 1986.

Litigation
Pilkington aggressively protected its patents and trade secrets through a network of licensing agreements with glass manufacturers around the world. The modern "float" technique (pouring the molten glass on a layer of very pure molten tin) became commercially widespread when Alastair Pilkington developed a practical version, patented in the late 1950s and early 1960s. As Pilkington plc owned all but one of the manufacturing plants around the world employing the float process Pilkington had a monopoly.

Although the patents had expired by the early 1980s, Pilkington had licensed their use, and required the licensees to keep the details of the float glass process secret. Guardian Industries had tried to challenge Pilkington's dominance but had made a secret agreement to prevent new entrants into the market, with Guardian taking the lead to enable Pilkington, a British company, to reduce its exposure to United States antitrust law.

In May 1994, the United States Department of Justice filed suit on the grounds that Pilkington had created a cartel by exercising control over the markets in which its licensees could sell float glass and construct float-glass manufacturing plants, and over the customers within each market to which each licensee could serve. It was claimed this was a violation of the Sherman Antitrust Act, because Pilkington's patents had expired and any trade secrets which it might have had in the process used by the licensees had long since become publicly known. On the same day, the government and Pilkington filed a proposed consent decree, which enjoined Pilkington from enforcing these restrictions against its US licensees, or against US non-licensees, or against non-US licensees wishing to export either technology or glass products to the United States. The agreement came into force on 22 December 1994, and expired ten years later.

Pilkington Optronics
In 1988, Pilkington plc formed a new subsidiary, Pilkington Optronics, in order to group together the company's optronics businesses: Pilkington PE located in North Wales (formed in 1966), and Barr and Stroud (acquired in 1977) which was based in Glasgow. Pilkington PE later became Thales Optics Ltd., which was divested from Thales in December 2005 as Qioptiq Ltd.

Thomson-CSF acquired 50% of Pilkington Optronics in 1991. In 1995, Pilkington Optronics acquired Thorn EMI Electro Optics which was renamed Pilkington Thorn Optronics. Three years later, Thomson-CSF purchased another 40% of Pilkington Optronics from Pilkington and the remainder in 2000 to make it a wholly owned subsidiary. In 2000, Thomson-CSF was renamed Thales and Pilkington Optronics Ltd. became Thales Optronics Ltd. Soon afterward, Thomson-CSF acquired W Vinten Ltd, a British reconnaissance equipment manufacturer, including the Joint Reconnaissance Pod, who now operate as Thales Optronics (Bury St Edmunds) Ltd.

In November 2006, Thales Optronics Limited announced the closure of its manufacturing facility in Taunton, Somerset, with the loss of 180 jobs. In June 2007, Thales sold the beryllium mirrors and structures business of Thales Optronics Limited to GSI Group Inc. for an undisclosed amount.

Takeover by NSG
In late 2005, the company received a takeover bid from a bigger Japanese company, NSG. The initial bid and the first revised bid were not accepted, but on 16 February 2006 NSG increased its offer for the 80% it did not already own to 165 pence per share (£1.8 billion or $3.14 billion in total) and this was accepted by Pilkington's major institutional shareholders, enabling NSG to compulsorily acquire by scheme of arrangement the smaller holdings of other shareholders, many of them being existing and retired employees, who had not wished to support the takeover. The combined company would compete for global leadership in the glass industry with the leading Japanese glassmaker Asahi Glass, which had around a quarter of the global market at the time of the deal. Pilkington had 19% and NSG around half that.

The acquisition was completed in June 2006, after the European Commission stated that it would not be opposed.

Chairmen
An incomplete list:
1914–1921: Arthur Richard Pilkington (1871–1921)
1921–1931: Richard Austin Pilkington (1871–1951)
1932–1949: Geoffrey Langton Pilkington (1885–1972)
1949–1973: Baron Pilkington (1905–1983)
1973–1980: Sir Alastair Pilkington (1920–1995)
1980–1995: Sir Antony Pilkington (1935–2000)
1995–2006: Sir Nigel Rudd (born 1946)

Operations
Pilkington has developed a self-cleaning coated float glass product, called Pilkington Activ. This self-cleaning glass has a coating which uses a method of photocatalysis to break down organic dirt with sunlight. The dirt is then washed away by the rain during a hydrophilic process.

References
Notes

Bibliography

External links

Official UK site
Pilkington energiKare – Energy Efficient Glazing

Glassmaking companies of the United Kingdom
Companies based in Merseyside
St Helens, Merseyside
Manufacturing companies established in 1826
1826 establishments in England
Companies formerly listed on the London Stock Exchange
Former defence companies of the United Kingdom
Sumitomo Group
British companies established in 1826
British subsidiaries of foreign companies
2006 mergers and acquisitions